Center Forward is an American political action committee advocating selected policies in the United States government. The group has been heavily funded with dark money donations from the pharmaceutical industry's lobbying group.

The organization has roots in the Blue Dog Coalition of Democrats who hold some common views with Republican counterparts. The organization’s stated mission is to promote business growth and maintain fiscal responsibility while also promoting meaningful reforms. After the Blue Dog Coalition whittled down in members, the organization was founded to promote similar ideas. Blue Dog members have noted that Center Forward could be the path towards the return of a Democratic majority.

Center Forward has endorsed various politicians, including John Barrow in Georgia’s 2014 elections. Center Forward reportedly spent $1 million on national television ads promoting a bipartisan approach to balancing the budget. It is chaired by former Democratic Representative Bud Cramer. In April 2019, Center Forward held an event for senior Republican and Democratic Congressional staffers at the Salamander Resort and Spa, featuring health insurance industry lobbyists who are leading opposition to Medicare for All.

References

United States political action committees